The Rengg Pass (locally known as Ränggpass) is a walking trail mountain pass in Switzerland, between Hergiswil in the canton of Nidwalden and Alpnach in the canton of Obwalden.  It crosses the ridge running eastwards from the Pilatus towards Stanstaad.

It was the site of the Stecklikrieg battle on 28 August 1802, where insurgent Nidwaldeners defeated Swiss central government troops.

References

See also
 List of mountain passes

Mountain passes of Nidwalden
Mountain passes of Obwalden
Mountain passes of Switzerland
Mountain passes of the Alps
Nidwalden–Obwalden border